Gallo Manor is a suburb of Johannesburg, South Africa. It is located in Region 3 and Region 7.

Much of the suburb is cordoned off as a gated settlement.

Gallo Manor is bounded by Wendywood and the Johannesburg Country Club. The suburb is near to Sandton and has good access to major arterial roads connecting to Fourways, Kyalami, Midrand and OR Tambo International Airport easy.

References

Johannesburg Region E